Christoph Tobias Metzelder (born 5 November 1980) is a German former professional footballer who played as a centre-back. 

Most of his professional career, which was spent mostly at Borussia Dortmund, was blighted by injuries. He did manage, however, to appear 47 times for the Germany national team, representing the country at two World Cups and Euro 2008.

Metzelder also played three seasons apiece for Real Madrid and Schalke 04, amassing Bundesliga totals of 178 matches and four goals over one full decade.

Career

Borussia Dortmund

Metzelder was born in Haltern, North Rhine-Westphalia. In the summer of 2000 he signed with Borussia Dortmund from SC Preußen Münster, and he was an instant success. At the end of his first season in the Bundesliga he won his first cap for Germany, playing the second half of a 5–2 friendly win in Hungary on 15 August 2001.

The second campaign at Dortmund brought Metzelder the 2002 national title and 14 matches with Germany, all the way to the 2002 FIFA World Cup final with the latter. However, he missed the entire 2003–04 due to an Achilles tendon injury, and only took part in 16 league games in the following season.

After over two years out of the national squad, Metzelder was called by new boss Jürgen Klinsmann for a friendly with China, in October 2005. He also scored his first two league goals, in 1–1 draws against Mainz 05 and Hamburger SV, and would be Germany's undisputed starter at the 2006 World Cup, partnering with SV Werder Bremen's Per Mertesacker.

Real Madrid

On 18 April 2007, after failing to renew his contract at Borussia, Metzelder transferred to Real Madrid at the end of the season on a free transfer. In February 2008, after managing to be injury-free in the first months of his Spanish adventure, he had surgery on the sole of his foot, resulting in him missing nearly 60 days of action; on 11 May, after having already missed the UEFA Champions League round-of-16 clash against A.S. Roma, he returned and played the full 90 minutes against Real Zaragoza (2–2 away draw).

Despite his lack of playing time, Metzelder featured in all of Germany's matches at UEFA Euro 2008, again partnering Mertesacker. In 2008–09's La Liga, he was the main beneficiary of a ten-match suspension handed to Real's Pepe; after a stellar performance in a 4–2 win at Sevilla FC he also started in the 6–2 home defeat at the hands of FC Barcelona, for a career-best – in Spain – 12 appearances.

Metzelder left Real Madrid after his contract expired on 30 June 2010.

Return to Germany

On 27 April 2010, prior to the end of the campaign, Metzelder announced his return to Germany, agreeing on a three-year contract with FC Schalke 04, with which he had already played youth football 15 years earlier. His first two league games with the club, the first of 2010–11, ended with 2–1 losses, to Hamburger SV and Hannover 96.

Metzelder appeared in ten complete matches in the season's Champions League, in an eventual last-four run. He added five in the domestic cup victorious campaign, including the semi-finals against FC Bayern Munich (1–0 win) and the final against MSV Duisburg (5–0).

In May 2013, 32-year-old Metzelder announced his retirement from professional football at the end of the campaign. In July 2019, he was hired as a pundit by public broadcaster ARD. At the time of coming under criminal investigation in September 2019 he was a pundit for Sky Sports.

Personal life
Metzelder's younger brother, Malte, was also a footballer (and a centre-back), and both played for Borussia Dortmund.

He has one daughter, Emma (born 17 October 2009), with girlfriend Julia Gödicke.

In 2006 he founded an organisation helping socially disadvantaged German youth and continues to run it.

Legal issues
Metzelder was being investigated for the potential distribution of child pornography, which led him to step down from his role as president of his former club TuS Haltern am See in September 2019.

On 4 September 2020, the district court of the city of Düsseldorf announced that an official charge had been filed against Metzelder by the prosecutor. The prosecutor did not express any specific suspicions. The district court stated in a press release that one female witness received 10 child pornographic pictures, another female witness received 16 child pornographic pictures and two child pornographic videos and a third female witness received one child pornographic picture—all distributed by using Metzelder's WhatsApp account. The statement also mentioned nearly 300 media files with child pornographic content having been found on Metzelder's confiscated cell phone. Metzelder himself had the allegations denied by his lawyers. On 14 September, it was reported that the Düsseldorf court's decision "indirectly stated" that Metzelder had confessed. His trial was on 29 April 2021 and he was sentenced to a ten-month suspended prison sentence for owning and distributing child pornography. Giving evidence at trial, he admitted he had collected and disseminated child pornography, and that he engaged in "extreme fantasies in chats."

In April 2021, Metzelder's lawyer stated Metzelder was in therapy for "certain issues such as sexuality or dealing with women in certain situations" but was "obviously not" a paedophile.

Career statistics

Club

International

Honours
Borussia Dortmund
Bundesliga: 2001–02
DFB-Ligapokal runner-up: 2003
UEFA Cup runner-up: 2001–02

Real Madrid
La Liga: 2007–08
Supercopa de España: 2008

Schalke 04
DFB-Pokal: 2010–11
DFL-Supercup: 2011; runner-up: 2010

Germany
FIFA World Cup runner-up: 2002; third place: 2006
UEFA European Championship runner-up: 2008

Individual
Bravo Award: 2002

References

External links

 

1980 births
Living people
People from Haltern
Sportspeople from Münster (region)
Footballers from North Rhine-Westphalia
German footballers
Association football defenders
Bundesliga players
TuS Haltern players
SC Preußen Münster players
Borussia Dortmund players
FC Schalke 04 players
La Liga players
Real Madrid CF players
Germany under-21 international footballers
Germany international footballers
2002 FIFA World Cup players
2006 FIFA World Cup players
UEFA Euro 2008 players
German expatriate footballers
Expatriate footballers in Spain
German expatriate sportspeople in Spain
People convicted of child pornography offenses
Sportspeople convicted of crimes